Simonne Ratel (22 July 1900 – 20 November 1948) was a 20th-century French woman of letters. She was the winner of the 1932 edition of the prix Interallié.

Works (selection) 
1929: Trois parmi les autres
1930: Dialogues à une seule voix
1932: 0º Coktail
1932: Histoire du Poussin Chaussé, tale for children illustrated by 
1932: La Maison des bories (novel), volume I of the "Isabelle Comtat" cycle – prix Interallié.
1932: Ben Kiki l'invisible
1933: Mlle Tarlatane en Amérique, tale for children illustrated by Jacqueline Duché
1934: Mlle Tarlatane au pays du cinéma, tale for children illustrated by Jacqueline Duché
1935: Le Raisin vert, volume II of the "Isabelle Comtat" cycle
1939: Contes du hérisson blanc
1940: La Fuite sous les bombes : récit d'une polonaise
1944: Contes de la terre et de la mer

Notes

External links 
 La Maison des Bories in "Guide du roman de langue française: 1901-1950"
 Poems by Simonne Ratel
 Portrait of Simonne Ratel (postcard)

20th-century French non-fiction writers
Prix Interallié winners
People from Nord (French department)
1900 births
1948 deaths
20th-century French women writers